Barbara Muta (born 31 December 1982) is a Papua New Guinean footballer who plays as a midfielder. She has been a member of the Papua New Guinea women's national team.

References

1982 births
Living people
Women's association football midfielders
Papua New Guinean women's footballers
Papua New Guinea women's international footballers